"Candy Shop" is the second single by rapper 50 Cent from his second commercial album, The Massacre (2005). It features Olivia and was written by 50 Cent.

"Candy Shop" peaked at number one on the Billboard Hot 100, becoming 50 Cent's third number one single and fifth top-ten single. It received mixed reviews from critics, with some calling it a retread of 50 Cent's collaboration with Lil' Kim on "Magic Stick" (2003). At the 2006 Grammy Awards, it was nominated for Best Rap Song, and at the 2005 MTV Video Music Awards, the music video was nominated for Best Male Video.

Background 
In an interview with XXL magazine, rapper Fat Joe claimed that he helped produce the track while working with producer Scott Storch. He stated:  When writing the song, 50 Cent stated:

Composition 
"Candy Shop" is a mid-tempo dancefloor track. The song was produced by Scott Storch, who took influence from Middle Eastern music. The track samples The Salsoul Orchestra's "Love Break". The production was described by IGN as having a "Middle Eastern tinge" with synthesized strings that "unleash a darkly atonal whirl that sounds too much like something either Timbaland or The Neptunes or Mannie Fresh have concocted". The Guardian wrote that the production contains "wan-sounding imitations of the Neptunes' sparse, breathy funk". PopMatters described the bridge as being "relaxed yet faintly ominous" with 50 Cent and Olivia crooning: "Girl what we do (what we do) / And where we do (and where we do) / The things we do (things we do) / Are just between me and you (oh yeah)." Rolling Stone noted the chorus for 50 Cent's "amateur-sounding tenor croon".

Critical reception
The song received mixed reviews from critics. PopMatters described it as "dripping with sexual energy and cool" and is "sexy as hell, but contains a pretty unmistakable edge of hostility, macho swagger, and thunderous chest thumping." Entertainment Weekly wrote that it was an "appealing throwaway single" and lyrics such as "after you work up a sweat, you can play with the stick" are not seductions; "they're orders". MusicOMH wrote that the chemistry between 50 Cent and Olivia "is almost as explicit as the lyrics ... the bass line is made for grinding to". Author Ethan Brown, in a review of The Massacre, called the track "uninspiring" and "nearly identical" to his previous collaboration with Lil' Kim on "Magic Stick". He stated that 50 Cent seemed too content with his "hypersexual image" among other things and "not inspired enough to work beyond the same old attention-getting schemes." Pitchfork Media listed "Candy Shop" as a reprise of "Magic Stick" both "in beats and in timbre", and Stylus magazine said it was "more of the same" as his previous collaboration. Billboard wrote that 50 Cent "shows little growth lyrically" with the song being "typical playa-friendly fodder". The song was nominated at the 2006 Grammy Awards for Best Rap Song, but lost to Kanye West's "Diamonds from Sierra Leone".

Chart performance 
"Candy Shop" performed well in the United States, becoming 50 Cent's third number one single, fifth solo top-ten single, and seventh overall top-ten single. The song was a fast climber on the Hot 100 debuting at #53 on the Billboard Hot 100. In its second week on the chart, the song jumped to #30. "Candy Shop" then jumped to #8 in its third week. In its fourth week, the song charted at #2. It peaked at #1 in its fifth week, where it remained for nine straight weeks. It remained on the chart for 23 weeks. The track reached number one on the Hot R&B/Hip-Hop Songs, Hot Rap Tracks, and Rhythmic Top 40 charts. The song also did well on pop-oriented charts, reaching #2 on the Pop 100 and #5 on the Top 40 Mainstream. "Candy Shop" was helped on the Hot 100 and Pop 100 by its strong digital downloads, peaking at #1 on the Hot Digital Songs. The RIAA certified the track Platinum in 2006. Across Europe, the song reached number one in Austria, Belgium, Germany, and Switzerland, and the top five in Ireland, Norway, the Netherlands, and the United Kingdom. In Australia, the track peaked at number three, was certified Platinum by the Australian Recording Industry Association, and on the 2005 year-end chart, it was listed at #24. It reached number two in New Zealand.

Music video 
The music video was directed by Jessy Terrero on January 11–12, 2005, and filmed in Hollywood, California. Due to rapper Trick Daddy's music video for "Sugar (Gimme Some)" already having candy references, 50 Cent said, "we tried to do something a little different" and not follow the same route. The video features Olivia as the lead dancer and several models including Chessika Cartwright (as a dominatrix) and Stephanie "Lyric" Evans (as a nurse). It features cameo appearances from Lil Scrappy, former WWE Diva and TNA Knockout Kristal Marshall, former Deal Or No Deal model Leyla Milani, G-Unit member Lloyd Banks, and Young Buck. It was nominated for Best Male Video at the 2005 MTV Video Music Awards, but lost to Kanye West's "Jesus Walks". On February 2, 2005, the video debuted on MTV's Total Request Live  at number nine and remained on the chart for 46 days. It also reached number one on the MuchMusic video charts.

Track listing
 UK CD single #1
 "Candy Shop" - 3:31
 "Disco Inferno" - 3:34
 UK CD single #2
 "Candy Shop" - 3:34
 "Candy Shop" (Instrumental) - 3:34
 "Candy Shop" (Ringtone) - 0:38
 "Candy Shop" (Music Video) -5:34

Cover versions
In 2006, a cover version was used in the Frogz toys by Gemmy Industries. The particular model that plays the song has sparked controversy, as parents believed it to be inappropriate for children.

Dan Finnerty and The Dan Band famously covered the song in the film The Hangover (2009).

In 2011, German group The Baseballs released a rockabilly version of "Candy Shop", which reached number 69 on the Austrian singles chart. "Weird Al" Yankovic included the song in his polka medley "Polkarama!" from his 2006 album Straight Outta Lynwood. On the film Little Man Percy P made his own mixtape over it. Folk artist Suzanne Vega sampled "Candy Shop" for her 2014 release, "Tales from the Realm of the Queen of Pentacles".
The song was interpolated on Pop Smoke's 2020 single "The Woo", also featuring and produced by 50 Cent, and featuring Roddy Ricch.

Charts

Weekly charts

Year-end charts

Decade-end charts

All-time charts

Certifications

See also 
 List of European number-one hits of 2005
 List of number-one hits of 2005 (Austria)
 List of number-one hits of 2005 (Germany)
 List of number-one hits of 2005 (Switzerland)
 List of Hot 100 number-one singles of 2005 (U.S.)
 List of number-one R&B singles of 2005 (U.S.)

References 

2005 singles
50 Cent songs
Billboard Hot 100 number-one singles
European Hot 100 Singles number-one singles
Music videos directed by Jessy Terrero
Number-one singles in Austria
Number-one singles in Germany
Number-one singles in Switzerland
Olivia (singer) songs
Songs about casual sex
Song recordings produced by Scott Storch
Songs written by 50 Cent
Shady Records singles
Aftermath Entertainment singles
Interscope Records singles
Universal Music Group singles
Dirty rap songs
2004 songs